John I. Woodruff (November 24, 1864 – May 8, 1962) was an American football coach and member of the Pennsylvania House of Representatives. He served as the head football coach at Susquehanna University from 1892 to 1893.

Woodruff spent two term as a state representative from Snyder County, Pennsylvania from 1919 to 1922.

References

1864 births
1962 deaths
Bucknell University alumni
Republican Party members of the Pennsylvania House of Representatives
Susquehanna River Hawks football coaches
Susquehanna University alumni
People from Selinsgrove, Pennsylvania